"Take care of yourself", also known by its japanese title "The Beast that Shouted 'I' at the End of the World", is the twenty-sixth episode of Hideaki Anno's anime series Neon Genesis Evangelion, produced by Gainax. The episode was written by the series director Hideaki Anno and Yōji Enokido and directed by Kazuya Tsurumaki, with additional dialogue. It aired originally on TV Tokyo on the 27th of March 1996. The series is mostly set in the futuristic, fortified city Tokyo-3, fifteen years after a worldwide cataclysm named Second Impact. The protagonist is Shinji Ikari, a teenage boy whose father Gendo has recruited him to the organization Nerv to pilot a giant bio-machine mecha named Evangelion to combat beings called Angels. In the episode, Tokyo-3 is attacked by the Angel Sachiel, who fights the United Nations Army and the JSSDF. Gendo summons Shinji for the first time and Shinji reluctantly agrees to pilot the mecha.

Plot Summary 
The Human Instrumentality Project continues as mankind attempts to complete its existence. Shinji continues to struggle with the impact of his personal existence, and eventually views a world (resembling a light-hearted, comedic high school setting) in which he is not an Evangelion pilot. Shinji, now understanding that his existence is not fixed, destroys the constrictive shell which he had formed around himself. He is met by all of the other characters from the series, who applaud and congratulate him, and, in response, he thanks them all.

Reception 
Due to the controversial and ambiguous nature of the episode, the audience reception was mixed. Some viewers found the episode to be a fitting conclusion to the series, while others felt that it was unsatisfying and confusing, which even led to death threats to the series creator Hideaki Anno. The episode features a combination of live-action and animation, and its focus on psychological and religious themes has been the subject of much analysis and interpretation.

Some viewers praised the episode for its deep exploration of the main characters' inner struggles and the series' overarching themes of psychological trauma and religious symbolism. Others felt that the episode was too abstract and failed to provide clear answers or closure to the story.

Many fans and critics have noted that the episode deviates significantly from the established continuity of the series, and that the climax of the episode is open to multiple interpretations. Some interpreted the episode as a commentary on the nature of humanity and the role of religion in our lives, while others saw it as a representation of the characters' personal struggles with mental illness and self-acceptance.

References

External links 

1996 Japanese television episodes
Neon Genesis Evangelion episodes
Metafictional television episodes
Television episodes with live action and animation
Works about existentialism